Slovenská Ves ( and) is a village and municipality in Kežmarok District in the Prešov Region of north Slovakia.

Geography

The municipality lies at an altitude of 650 metres and covers an area of 22.4 km2. It has a population of 1862 inhabitants. It is located under the largest mountain in middle Europe called the Tatras, surrounded by lush forests, with a lot of natural wells, rich in mushrooms and berries, being as a living space for wild animals as a bear, deer or fox.

History
In historical records, the village was first mentioned in 1311. It had been also known under the name Windschendorf.

The main employment of the village population since its establishment was agricultural manufacture.  The main crops were and still are wheat and potatoes. Because of large meadows on mountain roots, a sheep breeding was the next favorite activity.

Economy and infrastructure

In the village there are several sport clubs, like table tennis, or football. In Slovenská Ves there is also a ski lift and a gym hall. Gothic Roman Catholic church and a classistic manor house are the most important cultural attractions for sightseeing.

Near the village is located a Jewish cemetery which was being built before the second world war. It was restored few years ago and now serves as a worth memory for the next generations.

The area of the village location is called Spiš which isn't very densely populated. This is a big advantage for people enjoying free space and fresh air. The closest bigger city (population ↑15k)  is 12 km far away, the village is a crossroad to the Tatras and to Poland.

References

External links
http://www.slovenskaves.sk Official homepage 
Article about church in Slovenská Ves 
Video about the village
Weather in Slovenská Ves 

Villages and municipalities in Kežmarok District